An EMD SD38AC is a 6-axle diesel-electric locomotive built by General Motors Electro-Motive Division between June and October 1971. This model is an SD38 with an AR10 alternating current alternator instead of the SD38's normal direct current generator. It produces  from a 16-cylinder EMD 645E roots blown prime mover. It came equipped with or without dynamic brakes. This locomotive shares a common frame with the SD38, SD39, SD40 and SD45. The SD38AC was a transition between the SD38 and its successor, the SD38-2. 15 examples of this model were built; 6 for B&LE, 8 for DMIR and one for BC Hydro.

Original owners

References 
 
 Sarberenyi, Robert. EMD SD38, SD38AC, and SDP38 Original Owners. Retrieved on August 27, 2006

External links
 Sarberenyi, Robert. EMD SD38, SD38AC, and SDP38 Original Owners

SD38AC
C-C locomotives
Diesel-electric locomotives of the United States
Railway locomotives introduced in 1971
Freight locomotives
Standard gauge locomotives of the United States
Standard gauge locomotives of Canada